Hippopodina is a genus of bryozoans belonging to the family Hippopodinidae.

The genus has almost cosmopolitan distribution.

Species:

Hippopodina adunca 
Hippopodina ambita 
Hippopodina bernardi 
Hippopodina bilamellata 
Hippopodina californica 
Hippopodina emerensis 
Hippopodina feegeensis 
Hippopodina iberica 
Hippopodina inaequalis 
Hippopodina indicata 
Hippopodina inversa 
Hippopodina iririkiensis 
Hippopodina irregularis 
Hippopodina lappi 
Hippopodina pectoralis 
Hippopodina pulcherrima 
Hippopodina stephensi 
Hippopodina tahitiensis 
Hippopodina vibraculifera

References

Bryozoan genera